The Ach is a tributary of the Ammer river in Bavaria, Germany. It is the main river flowing through the Staffelsee, and flows into the Ammer east of Peißenberg.

See also
List of rivers of Bavaria

References

Rivers of Bavaria
Rivers of Germany